Jacob Burney (born January 24, 1959) is an American football coach and former player.

Playing career
He was a four-year starter at the University of Tennessee at Chattanooga but went undrafted. He had tryouts with the Detroit Lions but was not signed to their roster.

Coaching career
He coached in the college ranks for 11 years for the University of New Mexico, University of Tulsa, Mississippi State University, University of Wisconsin, UCLA, and University of Tennessee.

In 1994, he joined the Cleveland Browns to become their defensive line coach; he stayed there until 1998. In 1999, he joined the Carolina Panthers to be their defensive line coach and coached there until 2001. In 2002, he was hired for the same position by the Denver Broncos. Burney worked as defensive line coach for the Washington Redskins from 2010-14. The 2013 Redskins defensive line helped the team rank fourth in third-down conversion percentage (34.0) and tied for second in negative rushing plays by opponents (72). In 2014, his defensive line helped the Redskins rank 12th in the NFL in rushing yards allowed and the defense posted 36 sacks.

Burney was hired by the Cincinnati Bengals in 2016 to coach defensive line, rejoining Marvin Lewis from their Baltimore Ravens days, and replacing Jay Hayes who departed for the Tampa Bay Buccaneers.

References

1959 births
Living people
American football defensive tackles
Baltimore Ravens coaches
Carolina Panthers coaches
Chattanooga Mocs football players
Cleveland Browns coaches
Denver Broncos coaches
Washington Redskins coaches
Cincinnati Bengals coaches
People from Chattanooga, Tennessee
New Mexico Lobos football coaches
Tulsa Golden Hurricane football coaches
Mississippi State Bulldogs football coaches
Wisconsin Badgers football coaches
Tennessee Volunteers football coaches
UCLA Bruins football coaches